The Battle of Attu (codenamed Operation Landcrab), which took place on 11–30 May 1943, was a battle fought between forces of the United States, aided by Canadian reconnaissance and fighter-bomber support, and Japan on Attu Island off the coast of the Territory of Alaska as part of the Aleutian Islands Campaign during the American Theater and the Pacific Theater. Attu is the only land battle in which Japanese and American forces fought in snowy conditions, in contrast with the tropical climate in the rest of the Pacific. The more than two-week battle ended when most of the Japanese defenders were killed in brutal hand-to-hand combat after a final banzai charge broke through American lines.

Background
The strategic position of the islands of Attu and Kiska off Alaska's coast meant their location could control the sea lanes across the Northern Pacific Ocean. Japanese planners believed control of the Aleutians would therefore prevent any possible U.S. attacks from Alaska. This assessment had already been inferred by U.S. General Billy Mitchell who told the U.S. Congress in 1935, "I believe that in the future, whoever holds Alaska will hold the world. I think it is the most important strategic place in the world."

On 7 June 1942, six months after the United States entered World War II, the 301st Independent Infantry Battalion from the Japanese Northern Army landed unopposed on Attu. The landings occurred one day after the invasion of nearby Kiska. The U.S. military now feared both islands could be turned into strategic Japanese airbases from which aerial attacks could be launched against mainland Alaska and the rest of the U.S. West Coast.

In Walt Disney's 1943 film, Victory Through Air Power, the use of the Aleutian Islands for American long-range bombers to bomb Japan was postulated.

Recapture

On 11 May 1943, units from 17th Infantry, of Maj. Gen. Albert E. Brown's 7th U.S. Infantry Division made amphibious landings on Attu to retake the island from Japanese Imperial Army forces led by Colonel Yasuyo Yamasaki. Despite heavy naval bombardments of Japanese positions, the American troops encountered strong entrenched defenses that made combat conditions tough. Arctic weather and exposure-related injuries also caused numerous casualties among U.S. forces. After two weeks of relentless fighting, however, American units managed to push the Japanese defenders back to a pocket around Chichagof Harbor.

On 21–22 May 1943, a powerful Japanese fleet assembled in Tokyo Bay in preparation for a sortie to repel the American attempt to recapture Attu. The fleet included the carriers Zuikaku, Shōkaku, Jun'yō, Hiyō, the battleships Musashi, Kongō, Haruna, and the cruisers Mogami, Kumano, Suzuya, Tone, Chikuma, Agano, Ōyodo, and eleven destroyers. The Americans, however, recaptured Attu before the fleet could depart.

On 29 May 1943, without hope of rescue, Yamasaki led his remaining troops in a banzai charge.  The surprise attack broke through the American front line positions. Shocked American rear-echelon troops were soon fighting in hand-to-hand combat with Japanese soldiers. The battle continued until almost all of the Japanese were killed. The charge effectively ended the battle for the island, although U.S. Navy reports indicate that small groups of Japanese continued to fight until early July 1943 and isolated Japanese survivors held out until as late as 8 September 1943. In 19 days of battle, 549 soldiers of the 7th Infantry Division were killed and more than 1,200 injured. The Japanese lost over 2,351 men, including Yamasaki; only 28 prisoners were taken.

Aftermath
Attu was the last action of the Aleutian Islands Campaign. The Japanese Northern Army secretly evacuated its remaining garrison from nearby Kiska, ending the Japanese occupation in the Aleutian Islands on 28 July 1943.

The loss of Attu and the evacuation of Kiska came shortly after the death of Admiral Isoroku Yamamoto, who was killed by American aircraft in Operation Vengeance. These defeats compounded the demoralizing effect of losing Yamamoto on the Japanese High Command. Despite the losses, Japanese propaganda attempted to present the Aleutian Island campaign as an inspirational epic.

Order of battle
IJA 2nd District, North Seas Garrison (Hokkai Shubitai) – Colonel Yasuyo Yamasaki
83rd Independent Infantry Battalion – Lieutenant-Colonel Isamu Yonegawa
303rd Independent Infantry Battalion "Watanabe Battalion" – Major Jokuji Watanabe
Aoto Provisional Anti-Aircraft Battalion – Major Seiji Aoto
Northern Kurile Fortress Infantry Battalion – Lieutenant-Colonel Hiroshi Yonekawa
6th Independent Mountain Artillery – Second Lieutenant Taira Endo
302nd Independent Engineer Company – Captain Chinzo Ono
6th Ship Engineer Regiment
2nd Company – Captain Kobayashi

US Landing Force Attu (US 7th Infantry Division) – Major-General Albert Brown, Brigadier General Eugene M. Landrum from May 16
Provisional Scout Battalion – Captain William H. Willoughby
7th Scout Company
7th Cavalry Reconnaissance Troop
Northern Force – Colonel Frank L. Culin
1st/17th Regimental Combat Team – Lieutenant Colonel Albert V. Hartl
Southern Force – Colonel Edward Palmer Earle, Colonel Wayne C. Zimmerman from May 12
2nd/17th Regimental Combat Team – Major Edward P. Smith
3rd/17th Regimental Combat Team – Major James R. Montague
2nd/32nd Regimental Combat Team – Major Charles G. Fredericks
Reinforcements/Combat Support
1st/32nd Regimental Combat Team – Lieutenant Colonel Earnest H. Bearss
3rd/32nd Regimental Combat Team – Lieutenant Colonel John M. Finn
1st/4th Regimental Combat Team (at Adak) – Major John D. O'Reilly
78th Coast Artillery (Anti-Aircraft) Regiment
50th Combat Engineer Battalion

Gallery

See also
Aleutian Islands World War II National Monument
Castner's Cutthroats, a specially-selected 65-man unit which performed reconnaissance missions in the Aleutian Islands during the Pacific War
Joe P. Martinez, a posthumous Medal of Honor recipient for actions during the Battle of Attu
Paul Nobuo Tatsuguchi, a Japanese Seventh Day Adventist who served as military surgeon on Attu and died during the fighting

References

Further reading

External links

Logistics Problems on Attu by Robert E. Burks.
Aleutian Islands Chronology
Aleutian Islands War
Red White Black & Blue – feature documentary about The Battle of Attu in the Aleutians during World War II
PBS Independent Lens presentation of Red White Black & Blue – The Making Of and other resources
 Soldiers of the 184th Infantry, 7th ID in the Pacific, 1943–1945
US Army Infantry Combat pamphlet- Part Two:  Attu
Oral history interview with Robert Jeanfaivre, navy veteran who took part in the Battle of Attu  from the Veterans History Project at Central Connecticut State University
Diary of Japanese doctor killed on Attu
Battle of Attu - United Newsreel footage

1943 in Alaska
1943 in Japan
Aleutian Islands campaign
American Theater of World War II
Attu
Attu
Attu
Attu
May 1943 events
Attu
Attu Island